On 1 July 2014, a van containing charcoal and an improvised explosive device exploded in Maiduguri, Borno State, northeastern Nigeria. It was detonated at about 8 am on a roundabout near a crowded market, killing at least 56 people and destroying several cars.

Security forces believe the perpetrators to be Boko Haram, a jihadist group whose insurgency began in 2009. Boko Haram have attacked Maiduguri more often than any other settlement. These attacks include those in July 2009, December 2010, May 2011, November 2011, January 2012, December 2012, January 2014, November 2014, January 2015, March 2015, September 2015, March 2016, October 2016, March 2017 and February 2021.

References

2014 murders in Nigeria
July 2014 bombing
2010s massacres in Nigeria
July 2014 bombing
Boko Haram bombings
Car and truck bombings in Nigeria
Improvised explosive device bombings in 2014
July 2014
Islamic terrorist incidents in 2014
July 2014 crimes in Africa
July 2014 events in Africa
Marketplace attacks in Nigeria
Mass murder in 2014
July 2014 bombing
Terrorist incidents in Nigeria in 2014